Glona Gollayan Labadlabad, is a Filipino politician currently serving as a member of the House of Representatives of the Philippines, representing the 2nd district of Zamboanga del Norte since 2016.

Political career
Labadlabad made her first run in 2013 for municipal mayor of Katipunan, but was defeated. She then made her run and won in 2016 as representative of the province's second district, succeeding her husband, then-Congressman Rosendo Labadlabad. She was re-elected as representative in the elections of 2019 and in 2022 by a landslide vote.

House of Representatives
In the 18th Congress, she is currently the chairperson of the House Committee on Ecology, and sits as member of the House Committees on Foreign Affairs, and Appropriations.

Controversies
In 2019, Glona and Rosendo Labadlabad were charged with obstruction of justice for harboring a self-confessed killer from the neighboring town of Siayan, Zamboanga del Norte.

Electoral history

References

External links
 

Living people
Politicians from Zamboanga del Norte
PDP–Laban politicians
Members of the House of Representatives of the Philippines from Zamboanga del Norte
Year of birth missing (living people)
21st-century Filipino politicians